Wifemistress is a 1977 Italian romantic movie directed by Marco Vicario.

Plot
Ever since her husband pronounced her frigid on the night of their wedding, Antonia DeAngelis (Laura Antonelli) has been bedridden.  When her husband disappears, she sets off in his horse and buggy on his route to find out what happened to him.  She learns about her husband's business, his passions, his political writing, his mistresses, and his indifference to the peasants on her family's land.

Her growing knowledge about her husband's life causes her own passions to stir, and she takes over her husband's business, his habits, his thoughts, and even his mistress. She begins an affair with a young foreign doctor, improves the conditions of the peasants, and publishes her husband's writings.

In reality, a murder charge has forced Luigi into hiding directly across the street from his own home, where he watches Antonia become his sexual and social equal from behind the slats of a boarded window. Once Antonia became aware of the fact that Luigi was watching her from his hiding place, she opened her windows wide and continued her erotic escapades. This tortured Luigi as he did not know his wife was capable of such passion and eroticism.

After the police drop the murder charge, he must decide whether and how to deal with his wife's transformation.

Cast
Laura Antonelli as Antonia De Angelis
Marcello Mastroianni as Luigi De Angelis
Leonard Mann as Dr. Dario Favella
William Berger as Count Brandini
Gastone Moschin as Vincenzo
Olga Karlatos as Dr. Paola Pagano
Stefano Patrizi as Enrico, Clara's fiancé
Luigi Diberti as Lawyer
Enzo Robutti as Priest
Daniele Gabbai as Young official

References

External links

1977 films
1970s Italian-language films
1977 romantic comedy films
Films directed by Marco Vicario
Italian romantic comedy films
1970s Italian films